

469001–469100 

|-bgcolor=#f2f2f2
| colspan=4 align=center | 
|}

469101–469200 

|-bgcolor=#f2f2f2
| colspan=4 align=center | 
|}

469201–469300 

|-id=219
| 469219 Kamoʻoalewa ||  || Kamoʻoalewa alludes to a celestial object that is oscillating, like its path in the sky as viewed from the Earth. He ʻāpana hōkūnaʻi i lele mai kona kino nui, he holo pū me ka honua a puni ka lā. Name conceived by A Hua He Inoa, ʻImiloa Astronomy Center of Hawaiʻi. || 
|}

469301–469400 

|-id=366
| 469366 Watkins ||  || Michael Watkins (born 1963) was Manager of JPL's Science Division from 2013–2015. He personally created a new vision for the Division, set the standard for scientific and strategic leadership and guided the Science Division in providing that leadership to JPL. In 2016, he became the ninth director of JPL. || 
|}

469401–469500 

|-bgcolor=#f2f2f2
| colspan=4 align=center | 
|}

469501–469600 

|-bgcolor=#f2f2f2
| colspan=4 align=center | 
|}

469601–469700 

|-bgcolor=#f2f2f2
| colspan=4 align=center | 
|}

469701–469800 

|-id=705
| 469705 ǂKá̦gára ||  || In the mythology of the ǀXam people of the Karoo region of southern Africa, ǂKá̦gára  and ǃHãunu fought an epic battle in the east using thunder and lightning, producing mountainous clouds and rain. The conflict was over ǂKá̦gára returning his younger sister, ǃHãunu's wife, to their parents.[The primary is being named  ǂKá̦gára  and the satellite is being named ǃHãunu.] || 
|-id=748
| 469748 Volnay ||  || The French village of Volnay is situated directly south of Beaune, in the famous Burgundy vineyard region. The discoverer appreciates greatly the Volnay red wine. || 
|-id=773
| 469773 Kitaibel ||  || Pál Kitaibel (1757–1817) was a Hungarian botanist and chemist. He spent several years investigating flora and fauna in the Carpathian Basin and surrounding mountains. In 1789 he independently discovered the element tellurium. The genus Kitaibelia of mallows was named after him. || 
|}

469801–469900 

|-bgcolor=#f2f2f2
| colspan=4 align=center | 
|}

469901–470000 

|-bgcolor=#f2f2f2
| colspan=4 align=center | 
|}

References 

469001-470000